The Embassy of Iraq, Ottawa is the embassy of Iraq in Ottawa, Ontario, Canada.  It is located at 189 Laurier Ave. East.

History
In the 1980s, the embassy was best known for its gala party held each year at the Chateau Laurier to celebrate Iraq National Day. In the late 1980s, plans were underway to build an elaborate new chancery costing $5 million in Lower Town, next door to the Chinese embassy.

One negative incident occurred on August 10 (Year???) when an Iranian who had lost three children in the Iran–Iraq War stabbed one of the Iraqi diplomats outside the Mayflower Restaurant on Elgin Street.  The Gulf War had a great effect on the embassy.  Four of Iraq's diplomats were expelled from Canada.  Hisham Ibrahim al-Shawi, a respected intellectual and career diplomat remained as ambassador but had his activities severely curtailed.  The plans for the new chancery were scrapped.  In April 1991, in response to events in Iraq, a Kurdish mob attacked the embassy with stones and Molotov Cocktails, but little damage and no injuries resulted.  In 1994, months before he was set to retire and return to Iraq, al-Shawi flew to London with over a quarter million dollars of the embassy's money which he publicly declared and deposited in a trust fund to be used by a future government of Iraq.  In London, he defected and became involved in the Iraqi opposition.

Iraqi former President Saddam Hussein never replaced al-Shawi as an ambassador and for a number of years, the embassy was run by more junior officers.  In the late 1990s the embassy was perennially short of cash and got in trouble for paying employees in alcohol and cigarettes.  The Canadian government did not bow to U.S. pressure to close the embassy during the 2003 invasion of Iraq, but Canada did expel a number of diplomats on suspicion of espionage.  The lone Iraqi diplomat who remained, chargé d'affaires Mamdouh Mustafa, shuttered himself inside the embassy, attending few functions and refusing to talk to the media.  In December 2003 Mustafa returned to Iraq, leaving the embassy vacant.

Today

In May 2004 the embassy reopened with a staff dispatched by the new Iraqi government, and a new then-ambassador Howar Ziad arrived at the end of the year.

See also
Foreign relations of Canada
Foreign relations of Iraq
Iraqi diplomatic missions

External links
 Official site

Iraq
Ottawa
Canada–Iraq relations